Promartes is a genus of mustelids, now extinct, which existed during the Miocene period.

Taxonomy
The genus was first described in 1942, by E. S. Riggs, who identified the sister genus Zodiolestes at the same time, and assigned to the family Mustelidae. It belongs to the subfamily Oligobuninae. Five species have been identified in the genus: Promartes darbyi, P. gemmarosae, P. lepidus, P. olcotti, andP. vantasselensis, three of which were originally identified as members of Oligobunis.

Notes

References

Prehistoric mustelids
Miocene mustelids
Prehistoric mammals of North America
Prehistoric carnivoran genera